K. T. Kanaran (6 June 19326 April 2006) was an Indian politician and leader of Communist Party of India. He represented Nadapuram constituency in 6th and 7th Kerala Legislative Assembly.

References

Communist Party of India politicians from Kerala